"A Kind of Magic" is the title track of the 1986 album of the same name by the British rock band Queen. It was written by the band's drummer, Roger Taylor, for the film Highlander and featured as the ending theme. The single reached number three in the UK Singles Chart, top ten in a number of European countries, and #42 on the US Billboard Hot 100. The song is the opening track on the band's compilation albums, Greatest Hits II, and Classic Queen.

Recording

Highlander
The phrase "a kind of magic" is used in Highlander by Connor MacLeod (Christopher Lambert) as a description of his immortality. Roger Taylor liked the phrase so much that he used it as inspiration for the song. There are references to the film in the lyrics: "one prize, one goal"; "no mortal man"; and "there can be only one". The single's cover art features an image of Clancy Brown in character as the film's villain, The Kurgan.

Composition
Taylor wrote the song, which originally appeared in the movie Highlander. Brian May described this original version as "quite lugubrious and heavy". For the album version, Freddie Mercury created a new bass line, added instrumental breaks, and changed the song's order to make it more chart friendly. Mercury and David Richards produced this new version.

In a radio interview in September 2017, Chris Rea claimed that he performed the finger clicks with which the song opens.

Live performances
The song was a live favourite on The Magic Tour of the same year, which proved to be Queen's last tour before the death of Freddie Mercury.

Taylor often included the song in solo set lists, and those with his band The Cross. On the Rock the Cosmos Tour of Europe, Taylor took lead vocals for the song at some concerts.

Music video
The music video for this song was directed by Russell Mulcahy, director of Highlander. Notable is that Brian May did not use his famous Red Special guitar in the music video, but instead a 1984 copy. In the video, Mercury is dressed as a magician type figure. He enters an abandoned theatre (The Playhouse Theatre in London) where May, Taylor and John Deacon (all dressed as stereotypical tramps) are asleep until awakened by Mercury's entrance. Mercury transforms the hobos into the Queen members, dressed regularly with their instruments, then back to hobos again as he leaves. Throughout the video, cartoon images dance to the beat of the song which were produced by The Walt Disney Company.As May later remembered, the theater was old and derelict, and lacking central heating, so the band were quite cold during the March filming.

Legacy
The single was certified platinum in Brazil for more than 100,000 digital downloads of the single.

Queen's compilations The Platinum Collection, Classic Queen, and Greatest Hits II all make an unsubstantiated claim that the song reached #1 in 35 countries around the world, but it reached number one in Spain in 1986, the only country where it topped the charts.

Musical theatre actress Elaine Paige recorded the song on her album of Queen covers The Queen Album in 1988.

Chart positions

Weekly charts

Sales and certifications

Personnel
Queen
Freddie Mercury – lead and backing vocals, synthesizer
Brian May – electric guitars
Roger Taylor – drums, drum machine, synthesizer, backing vocals
John Deacon – bass guitar
with
Chris Rea – uncredited fingerclicks

Usage in other media

 The music was used in the trailer for the film The Adventures of Pinocchio.
 A promotional music video, made by Boeing, was released called, Hornet Magic was released on VHS. The video was music video of the song set to video footage of F/A-18E/F Super Hornet fighter planes. In the video, the word "magic" appeared on screen every time it was mentioned in the song.
 A shortened version of the song is used in the opening credits of the children's animated series A Kind of Magic.
 The song was heard on a launch promo of Disney Channel in the UK in 1995, but also in 2009 for the launch in the Netherlands and Flanders.
 A sample of Mercury saying "Ha ha ha ha ha, it's magic" also appears in the Queen version of the song "I Was Born to Love You" from their 1995 album Made in Heaven.
 The BBC used the song as the background music for the 1986 edition of The Rock 'n' Roll Years (aired in 1994) when featuring footage from the all-Merseyside FA Cup final of that year, in which Liverpool beat Everton 3-1 at Wembley Stadium.
 It was used by the BBC for the introduction of the opening ceremony in the 1986 Commonwealth games in Edinburgh.

References

External links

 
Lyrics at Queen official website

Queen (band) songs
1986 singles
Animated music videos
Songs from Highlander (franchise)
Songs written by Roger Taylor (Queen drummer)
Song recordings produced by Reinhold Mack
Music videos directed by Russell Mulcahy
Hollywood Records singles
EMI Records singles
Capitol Records singles
Number-one singles in Spain
1986 songs